The 1967 NCAA College Division basketball tournament involved 36 schools playing in a single-elimination tournament to determine the national champion of men's NCAA College Division college basketball as a culmination of the 1966–67 NCAA College Division men's basketball season. It was won by Winston-Salem State University and Winston-Salem's Earl Monroe was the Most Outstanding Player.

Regional participants

*indicates a tie

Regionals

New England

Consolation- Northeastern 80, American International 53
Consolation- Rochester 76, Buffalo State 70

Mideast - Akron, Ohio
Location: Memorial Hall Host: University of Akron

Third Place - Baldwin–Wallace 106, Mount St. Mary's 82

East - Philadelphia, Pennsylvania
Location: Philadelphia Armory Host: Drexel Institute of Technology

Third Place -Wagner 61, Drexel 53

South - Evansville, Indiana
Location: Roberts Municipal Stadium Host: University of Evansville

Third Place - Tennessee State 65, Stetson 53

Southwest - Springfield, Missouri
Location: McDonald Hall and Arena Host: Southwest Missouri State University

Third Place - Arkansas State 105, Arkansas AM&N 93

Great Lakes - Terre Haute, Indiana
Location: ISU Arena Host: Indiana State University

Third Place - Luther 99, Southern Colorado 78

Pacific Coast - San Diego, California
Location: Peterson Gym Host: San Diego State College

Third Place - UC Davis 81, Portland State 61

Midwest - Normal, Illinois
Location: Horton Field House Host: Illinois State University at Normal

Third Place - North Dakota 107, Parsons 56

*denotes each overtime played

National Finals - Evansville, Indiana
Location: Roberts Municipal Stadium Host: University of Evansville

Third Place - Kentucky Wesleyan 112, Illinois State 73

*denotes each overtime played

All-tournament team
 Danny Bolden (Southwest Missouri State)
 Earl Monroe (Winston-Salem State)
 Lou Shepherd (Southwest Missouri State)
 Sam Smith (Kentucky Wesleyan)
 Dallas Thornton (Kentucky Wesleyan)

See also
 1967 NCAA University Division basketball tournament
 1967 NAIA Basketball Tournament

References

Sources
 2010 NCAA Men's Basketball Championship Tournament Records and Statistics: Division II men's basketball Championship
 1967 NCAA College Division Men's Basketball Tournament jonfmorse.com

NCAA Division II men's basketball tournament
Tournament
NCAA College Division basketball tournament
NCAA College Division basketball tournament